The Colombo Cabinet was the 26th cabinet of the Italian Republic. It held office from 6 August 1970 to 18 February 1972, for a total of 561 days (1 year, 6 months and 12 days). 

Colombo resigned on 15 January 1972, following the withdrawal of support from the PRI, which was contrary to the government's economic policy.

Party breakdown
 Christian Democracy (DC): prime minister, 15 ministers, 33 undersecretaries
 Italian Socialist Party (PSI): deputy prime minister, 5 ministers, 14 undersecretaries
 Italian Democratic Socialist Party (PSDI): 4 ministers, 9 undersecretaries
 Italian Republican Party (PRI): 1 minister, 2 undersecretaries

Composition

|}

References

Italian governments
1970 establishments in Italy
1972 disestablishments in Italy
Cabinets established in 1970
Cabinets disestablished in 1972